Chuck Berry's Golden Hits is the tenth studio album by Chuck Berry, released in 1967 by Mercury Records, his first for that label. It consists of new recordings of songs he had recorded for Chess Records and one new song. The re-recordings were performed with faster tempos and recorded in stereo. While the rest of Berry's albums for Mercury rest in obscurity, Golden Hits is still available. In 1989 the CD issue of the collection was augmented with several tracks that were left off the original album.

Track listing
All songs written by Chuck Berry.

Side one

 "Sweet Little Sixteen" (2:32)
 "Memphis" (2:07)
 "School Days (Ring Ring Goes the Bell)" (2:35)
 "Maybellene" (2:35)
 "Back in the U.S.A." (2:27)

Side two

 "Johnny B. Goode" (2:45)
 "Rock and Roll Music" (2:33)
 "Roll Over Beethoven" (2:02)
 "Thirty Days" (2:10)
 "Carol" (2:24)
 "Club Nitty Gritty" (2:18)

1989 CD reissue
 "Sweet Little Sixteen"
 "Memphis"
 "School Days"
 "Maybellene"
 "Back in the U.S.A."
 "Around and Around"
 "Brown Eyed Handsome Man"
 "Johnny B. Goode"
 "Rock and Roll Music"
 "Roll Over Beethoven"
 "Thirty Days"
 "Carol"
 "Let It Rock"
 "Reelin' and Rockin'"
 "Club Nitty Gritty"

Personnel
 Chuck Berry –  guitar, vocals
 Ebby Hardy –  drums
 Johnnie Johnson –  piano, electric piano
 Quincy Macon –  rhythm guitar
 Eugene Washington –  drums

References

External links

Chuck Berry albums
1967 albums
Mercury Records albums